Assistant Sub-inspector Babu Ram, AC (1972–2020) was a Police Officer of the Special Operations Group (SOG) Srinagar, who was awarded the highest peace time gallantry award, the Ashok Chakra.

Early life
Ram was born on May 15, 1972 in Dharana village in the Poonch district of Jammu region's Mendhar district, had aspired to join the armed services since he was a child.

Police career
After completing his education, he was assigned as a constable in the J&K Police in 1999. On July 27, 2002, he was assigned to the Special Operations Group (SOG) in Srinagar, where he participated in numerous anti-terror operations in which a number of hardcore terrorists were killed. During his time in the anti-insurgency unit he took part in 14 battles in which 28 terrorists were killed.

Babu Ram was a frequent frontrunner in counter-terrorist operations and he also received a premature promotion for his gallantry and conscientiousness.

Gallantly Action 
J&K Police officers and security forces were checking vehicles travelling through Pantha-Chowk. Three terrorists then arrived on a moped and attacked a paramilitary force member who was standing by the highway, taking his weapon and opening fire on the police and security forces indiscriminately. After the attack, the terrorists entered Dhobhi Mohalla in Pantha-Chowk. Immediately, the area was cordoned off and search operation was launched. ASI Ram was part of the advance party who launched an assault against holed up terrorists, the terrorists then opened fire at the joint search party, triggering an encounter. The encounter ended with the elimination of three Lashkar-e-Taiba (LeT) terrorists, including a commander. However, Ram was killed in this exchange.

Ashok Chakra 
On India's 75th Independence Day, the President of India posthumously awarded him the Ashok Chakra for his excellence, bravery, conscientiousness, and devotion. His family members were presented the award by the President of India on Republic Day 2022.

References 

ASI Babu RAM Biography in Hindi - https://hindiyojna.in/asi-babu-ram-biography-in-hindi/

1972 births
2020 deaths
Recipients of the Ashoka Chakra (military decoration)
Ashoka Chakra
Pahari Pothwari people
People from Poonch district, India